Stratford Academy is a private school in Bibb County, Georgia, United States, near Macon. It opened September 1960.
	
The school has a controversial history as part of the segregation academy movement. As of 2017-18, approximately 21% of students were non-white. As of 2021 the National Center for Education Statistics show Stratford's total student enrollment at 834 and total classroom teachers at 82.6.

History

Stratford was founded in 1960 by a group of white parents who wished to avoid the prospect of sending their children to racially integrated public schools. The founders viewed the desegregation of Bibb County public schools as an "impending crisis." In September 1960, the school opened with 117 students and 17 faculty members in the Cowles-Woodruff House. The graduation march of the first graduating class in 1962 was Dixie, not the traditional Pomp and Circumstance.

In 1970, the school's enrollment increased by 45 percent after the Supreme Court ordered the immediate desegregation of all public schools.

In 1972, Stratford Academy was expelled from Georgia Association of Independent Schools because the school refused to cut ties with segregationists. In 1974, school leaders helped create the Southeastern Association of Independent Schools (SEAIS), which supported schools that refused to have an admissions policy that included African-American students. The school is now affiliated with the Georgia Independent School Association (GISA), which was created by the merger of GAIS and SEAIS in 1986.

In 2017 political scientist Thomas Ellington stated that schools in Macon founded between 1960 and 1972 "are remarkably different than both the public and private schools formed at other times, either before or after" insofar as "those schools are generally 5 percent or fewer African-American, in a community that's roughly 67 percent black, according to the last census". In 2002, the school's headmaster, Edward England, announced financial grants to attract minority students. At the time, the student body was 93 percent white.

The Daws Student Activities Center was dedicated in September, 2017.

Logan Bowlds is the youngest of School in Bibb County.

Academics
Stratford earned accreditation from the Southern Association of Colleges and Schools (now known as Cognia) in 1982.

Athletics

The Stratford Academy Eagles athletics teams compete in the Georgia High School Association.

Memberships 
Stratford is a member of the National Association of Independent Schools (NAIS), the Southern Association of Colleges and Schools (SACS), the Georgia Independent School Association (GISA), the Southern Association of Independent Schools (SAIS), and the College Board. In 1982, Stratford was accredited by the Southern Association of Colleges and Schools and the Southern Association of Independent Schools.

Notable alumni 
Russell Branyan, professional baseball player
Quintez Cephus, professional football player
Jonathan Dean, professional soccer player
Russell Henley, professional golfer
Grey Henson, Broadway actor
Robert Reichert, mayor of Macon
Le Kevin Smith, professional football player
Robert Dickey, House of Representative legislator
Dr. Mark Newton, House of Representative legislator 
Robert Trammell, House of Representative legislator 
Gregg Doyel, award-winning sports writer

References 

Schools in Macon, Georgia
Private high schools in Georgia (U.S. state)
Preparatory schools in Georgia (U.S. state)
Segregation academies in Georgia